Edward Joseph Podolak (born September 1, 1947) is a former professional American football player, a running back for nine seasons with the Kansas City Chiefs of the American Football League and National Football League.

Early years
Ed Podolak was born on a small farm near Atlantic, Iowa on September 1, 1947. His father, Joe was a farmer and a military veteran and his mother Dorothy was a school teacher. Ed worked on the farm, played baseball in the summer, football in the fall, and basketball in the winter,  his parents allowing him to curtail his farm work during his athletic events. The Atlantic High School Trojan football teams went undefeated in Podolak's junior and senior seasons, as Ed quarterbacked the team, winning conference titles both years. The Atlantic Trojan basketball team made it to two state tournament appearances, with Podolak playing forward. Following high school, Iowa State University hired Podolak's high school coach, Howard Justice, to coach quarterbacks, but Podolak chose to attend the University of Iowa.

College football career
In this era, college freshmen were not eligible to play varsity sports, but Podolak won the starting quarterback job for Iowa as a sophomore. In his first college start, Podolak was named “Offensive Player of the Week” after the game against the Arizona Wildcats, a 42–7 Iowa victory. After starting at quarterback for two and a half years for the Hawkeyes, he moved to tailback, five games into his senior season, because of an injury to the starting tailback. He set a Hawkeye and Big 10 rushing record of 286 yards in his second start at running back.

In Podolak's college football career at the University of Iowa, he was a quarterback for two seasons before converting to running back. As a quarterback, Podolak threw 28 interceptions and 8 touchdowns, but he excelled as a running back in 1968, rushing for 937 yards and 8 touchdowns with an average of 6 yards per carry, while also catching 12 passes for 188 yards and another score.

In 1968, Podolak rushed for a then–Big Ten record with 286 yards on 17 carries in an Iowa 68–34 victory over Northwestern. Podolak earned All–Big 10 honors following the 1968 season.

Professional football career
Podolak was selected in the second round of the 1969 NFL/AFL draft, 48th overall, by the Kansas City Chiefs, and the team won Super Bowl IV in his rookie season.

During a nine-year career from 1969 to 1977, Podolak became the Chiefs' second all-time leading rusher with 4,451 yards and 34 touchdowns on 1,158 carries. He was also known for his work as a pass receiver, catching 288 passes for 2,456 yards and 6 touchdowns and as a return man on special teams, averaging 8.6 yards per punt and 20.5 yards per kickoff return. His 8,178 career combined yards are the second-most in the team's history. Podolak led the Chiefs in rushing four times, in receiving three times, and in punt returns three times.

In the Chiefs' playoff loss to the Miami Dolphins on Christmas Day in 1971 (still the longest game in NFL history), Podolak had a playoff-record 350 total yards: 85 rushing, 110 receiving, and 155 on returns. Podolak, who wore jersey number 14, was inducted into the Chiefs' Hall of Fame in 1989.

Broadcasting career
After retirement, Podolak turned to broadcasting. He worked as a color commentator for NFL telecasts on NBC in 1978. In 1982, he began working as a commentator for Iowa Hawkeye football games on WHO radio in Des Moines and a statewide network. He worked with play-by-play announcer Jim Zabel until 1996 and then with Gary Dolphin.

Awards and honors
Podolak was inducted into the Kansas City Chiefs Hall of Fame in 1989.
The Iowa High School Athletic Association inducted Podolak into its Football Hall of Fame in 2004.
In 2014, Podolak was inducted into the Missouri Sports Hall of Fame.
Podolak was inducted into the University of Iowa Athletics Hall of Fame in 2021.

See also
 List of American Football League players

References

External links
 
 

1947 births
Living people
American football quarterbacks
American football running backs
Iowa Hawkeyes football announcers
Iowa Hawkeyes football players
Kansas City Chiefs players
National Football League announcers
People from Atlantic, Iowa
Players of American football from Iowa
American Football League players